The Malawian passport is issued to citizens of Malawi for international travel.

As of 1 January 2017, Malawian citizens had visa-free or visa on arrival access to 67 countries and territories, ranking the Malawian passport 70th in terms of travel freedom (tied with Belarusian and Lesotho passports) according to the Henley visa restrictions index.

See also

Visa requirements for Malawian citizens
 List of passports

References

Passports by country
Government of Malawi
Foreign relations of Malawi
Malawi and the Commonwealth of Nations